Pansa Hemviboon (born 8 July 1990) is a Thai professional footballer who plays as a centre back for Thai League 1 club Buriram United and the Thailand national team.

International career
In March, 2018 he was in the squad of Thailand for 2018 King's Cup. he was called up by Thailand national team for the 2018 AFF Suzuki Cup.

Pansa was named for the final squad in 2019 AFC Asian Cup.

International goals 
Scores and results list Thailand's goal tally first.

Honours

Club
Buriram United
 Thai League 1
  Champions (3) : 2017, 2018, 2021-22
 Thai FA Cup
  Champions (1) : 2021–22
 Thai League Cup
  Champions (1) : 2021–22
 Thailand Champions Cup
  Champions (1) : 2019

International
Thailand
 AFF Championship (1): 2022

Individual
 FA Thailand Men's Player of the Year (1): 2017

References

External links
 

1990 births
Living people
Pansa Hemviboon
Pansa Hemviboon
Association football central defenders
Pansa Hemviboon
Pansa Hemviboon
Pansa Hemviboon
Pansa Hemviboon
Pansa Hemviboon
Pansa Hemviboon
2019 AFC Asian Cup players
Pansa Hemviboon